Count Louis Alexandre Andrault de Langeron (24 January 1763 – 16 July 1831), born in Paris, was a French soldier in the service of, first, the Kingdom of France, and then the Russian Empire.

Early life

Langeron, a member of a noble French family from Nivernais, held the titles of comte de Langeron, marquis de la Coste, baron de Cougny, de la Ferté et de Sassy, and lord du Mont, de Bazolle de l'Isle de Mars et d'Alligny. He entered the French army at age 15 in 1779 as an Enseigne surnumeraire in the Gardes Françaises Regimentunder Colonel M. le Marechal Due de Biron, and was appointed, in 1780, Sous-Lieutenant supernumerary in the regiment of Limosin, infantry, under his uncle, Mestre de Camp Commandant, M. le Comte de Damas de Cruz, in the Corps  d'armee under his cousin. Lieutenant General M. le Marquis de Langeron; destined for a descent on England. When this project was abandoned, he was, in 1781, on his own application, transferred as Sous-Lieutenant to the regiment of Bourbonnois and was dispatched to Caracas and then to Saint-Domingue from 1782 to 1783. Promoted to captain in the Condé-Dragons Regiment, he took part in the American Revolutionary War. Langeron was an original member of the Society of the Cincinnati and can be seen wearing his insignia for this order in the last position of his medal bar in his portrait by George Dawe. In 1786, Langeron was promoted to lieutenant-colonel in the Médoc Regiment, and in 1788 he became colonel of the Armagnac Regiment.

French Revolutionary Wars
A Royalist, Langeron left France at the beginning of the French Revolution and entered Russian service in 1790 as a colonel in the Siberian Grenadier Regiment. He distinguished himself in battle against Sweden and then in the Russo-Turkish War (1787–1792). Accompanied by the duc de Fronsac and Prince Charles de Ligne, the son of the famous Austrian diplomat Charles-Joseph, Prince de Ligne, he was present at Alexander Suvorov's capture of Izmail, where he was wounded. He was given leave of absence in order to serve in an émigré army against revolutionary France, and after his return to Russia was sent to the Austrian army in the Netherlands as an observer. He was promoted to brigade command in 1796 and became a major general in 1797 and lieutenant general in 1798.

Napoleonic Wars
He commanded the second column of the Austro-Russian army in the battle of Austerlitz, and disgraced after the lost battle, he was sent to Odessa. In 1815 he became governor of New Russia.

From 1806 to 1811, Langeron participated in the Russo-Turkish War (1806–1812) and served in the Army of Moldavia against the Ottomans. He fought at Giurgiu, Silistra, Frasin, Derekoy, and Ruse, for which he was promoted to General of Infantry. In 1812, Langeron was given command of a corps in the Army of the Danube with which he fought at Brest-Litovsk and on the Berezina. In 1813, Langeron was put in charge of the blockade of Thorn, and later that year he commanded a corps at Koenigswarte, Bautzen, Siebeneichen, Lowenberg, Katzbach, and Leipzig. The next year he participated in the French campaign, during which he fought at the battles of Soissons, Craonne, Laon, Rheims, La Fère-Champenoise, and Paris. In late 1814, Langeron was given command of the 4th and 6th Corps in Volhynia. During the Hundred Days, he and his troops were marching to France, but they had only reached middle Germany by the time Napoléon was defeated at Waterloo.

Later life

After a brief return in France, during the Bourbon Restoration, Langeron returned to Odessa as he was appointed the Military Governor of Kherson and Odessa, the commander-in-chief of the Bug and Black Sea Cossacks, and the Governor of Yekaterinoslav, Kherson, and Crimea. Exports continued to grow under his rule, to 40 million rubles in 1817. In Odessa, Langeron opened the Richelieu Lyceum for the elite: only the children of merchants and Greek immigrants could enroll. During Langeron's tenure, the construction of the Odessa Botanical Gardens and Primorsky Boulevard began. The most far-reaching legislation in Langeron's term was that the port of Odessa was pronounced a free port in 1819, which allowed the selling and storing of imported goods with no customs duties. Today Odessa has a street and a beach named after Langeron.

In 1823 Langeron was relieved of these duties because of poor health, and he then traveled to France until 1825. After the Decembrist revolt, Langeron was appointed a member of the sentencing panel. Called up with the start of the Russo-Turkish War, 1828-1829 he fought against the Turks in a number of battles until he was replaced by Hans Karl von Diebitsch. Langeron died during a cholera epidemic in 1831.

References

1763 births
1831 deaths
French counter-revolutionaries
Imperial Russian Army generals
Mayors of Odesa
Military personnel from Paris
Russian commanders of the Napoleonic Wars
Russian people of French descent
Recipients of the Order of St. George of the Second Degree
Recipients of the Order of St. George of the Third Degree
Knights Grand Cross of the Order of the Sword
Governors-General of Novorossiya